Clivina frenchi is a species of ground beetle in the subfamily Scaritinae. It was described by Sloane in 1898.

References

frenchi
Beetles described in 1896